Iris nectarifera  is a species in the genus Iris, it is also in the subgenus of Iris and in the Oncocyclus section. It is found in Iraq, Syria and southeastern Turkey. It has yellow or cream flowers which have purple veining, a purple signal patch and a yellow beard. It has a known variety from Turkey called I. nectarifera var. mardinensis.

Description
I. nectarifera has a stout rhizome with long stolons.

The flowers are similar in form to Iris sari (from Turkey) but Iris nectarifera has more characteristic stoloniferous roots and the flowers are also similar in form to Iris heylandiana from Northern Iraq. 

Like other irises, the flowers have 2 pairs of petals, 3 large sepals (outer petals), known as the 'falls' and 3 inner, smaller petals (or tepals, known as the 'standards'. The standards are paler in colour than the falls.
They are heavily veined with brownish-maroon or 
deep purple signal patch, in the middle with a narrow strip of yellow hairs about 0.8 cm wide, (or beard).

Biochemistry
As most irises are diploid, meaning having two sets of chromosomes. This can be used to identify hybrids and classification of groupings. It's chromosomes have not yet been counted.

Taxonomy
I. nectarifera is known as 'Ballı kurtkulağı' in Turkish.

It was first published and described by Adil Güner in 'Notes Roy. Bot. Gard. Edinburgh' (Notes from the Royal Botanic Garden Edinburgh) Vol.38 on page 413 in 1980.

It is an RHS accepted name and was last-listed in the RHS Plant Finder in 2009.

There is a known variety called I. nectarifera var. mardinensis Guner which has thinner leaves than I. nectarifera var. nectarifera, which are 0.8-0.9 cm wide and it has a perianth tube which is 2.0-2.5 cm long. It was found in Turkey and also published and described by Guner in Notes Roy. Bot. Gard. Edinburgh 38(3): 413 (1980). The specific epithet mardinensis refers to the Turkish city of Mardin in Turkish Kurdistan.

Distribution and habitat
It is native to temperate Western Asia.

Range
It is found in mainly in Turkey, but also in Syria and Iraq.

Habitat
It grows on terra rossa (soil) on the steppes.

Cultivation
In cultivation, its growing requirement are similar to the nearby found Iris gatesii (from the mountains of Turkey and Iraq).

Propagation
Irises can generally be propagated by division, or by seed growing.

Toxicity
Like many other irises, most parts of the plant are poisonous (rhizome and leaves), if mistakenly ingested, it can cause stomach pains and vomiting. Also handling the plant may cause a skin irritation or an allergic reaction.

References 

 Mathew, B. 1981. The Iris. 55–56.

nectarifera
Flora of Iraq
Flora of Syria
Flora of Turkey
Plants described in 1980
Garden plants